Atlantica  may refer to:
 Atlantica, an ancient continent
 Atlantica (gastropod), genus of land snails in the family Discidae
 Atlantica-1, a submarine telecommunications cable system linking the US, Bermuda, Venezuela and Brazil
 Atlántica (magazine), a magazine about art published in the Canary Islands
 Atlantica Online, an online game
 Atlantica (trade zone), a proposed free trade zone
  Atlantica, the eleventh stage in Gaiapolis.
 Atlantica, a Need for Speed III: Hot Pursuit track.
 Wingco Atlantica, a prototype aircraft